Whampoa is a housing estate located in the subzone of Balestier, which is a part of Novena planning area in Singapore, as defined by the Urban Redevelopment Authority. Within the context of the Housing and Development Board (HDB), however, Whampoa forms part of the Kallang/Whampoa New Town, together with the various housing precincts located in the adjacent Kallang planning area. This makes Kallang/Whampoa the only HDB new town that encompasses two planning areas, namely Novena and Kallang.

The area was named after Hoo Ah Kay, who was better known as "Whampoa" (his place of birth) during the early years of Singapore as a British settlement. He made many contributions to the Straits Settlements. In addition, he could speak both Chinese and English well, making him an important bridge between the two communities. The respect for his contributions resulted in this area being named after him.

The Whampoa area has a significantly higher proportion of elderly and has garnered significant media attention with regard to active ageing programmes.

Facilities
The area is mainly a housing estate consisting many blocks of the Housing and Development Board (HDB) flats, along with facilities such as a wet market and a hawker centre, named the Whampoa Makan Place. The Whampoa hawker centre has two food markets, one a night market and the other a day market. There is also a community club, a mosque, a Chinese temple, a NKF kidney dialysis centre and the Saint Michael's Bus Terminal.

Politics
The Whampoa area has been part of 
Jalan Besar GRC since 1997. However, it was Whampoa SMC between 2011 and 2015. The current Member of Parliament (MP) is Heng Chee How.

References

Novena, Singapore
Kallang
Central Region, Singapore